Bertram Türpe (22 July 1952 – 11 January 2014) was an East German swimmer. He competed at the 1972 Summer Olympics in the 200 m and 400 m individual medley, but failed to reach the finals. He won these two events at the national championships in 1971.

References

1952 births
2014 deaths
East German male swimmers
Male medley swimmers
People from Zingst
Olympic swimmers of East Germany
Swimmers at the 1972 Summer Olympics
Sportspeople from Mecklenburg-Western Pomerania